Wang Qi (born 17 October 1993) is a Chinese footballer currently playing as a midfielder for Sichuan Jiuniu.

Career statistics

Club
.

References

1993 births
Living people
Chinese footballers
Association football midfielders
China League Two players
China League One players
Tianjin Jinmen Tiger F.C. players
Sichuan Longfor F.C. players
Sichuan Jiuniu F.C. players